Jesus Christ Superstars is the fifth studio album by Slovenian industrial/electronic music group Laibach. It was released in 1996 and is a collection of cover versions and originals on the theme of religion. Unlike the albums before it, Jesus Christ Superstars has a much more guitar driven sound, with the overall result being reminiscent of the bands belonging to the genre of industrial metal.

Track listing 
 "God Is God" (Burton/Watkins) – 3:43
 "Jesus Christ Superstar" (Lloyd Webber/Rice) – 5:45
 "Kingdom of God" (Avsenik/Chris Bohn/Laibach) – 5:37
 "Abuse and Confession" (Avsenik/Chris Bohn/Laibach) – 6:14
 "Declaration of Freedom" (Chris Bohn/Laibach) – 5:33
 "Message from the Black Star" (Chris Bohn/Laibach) – 5:50
 "The Cross" (Prince) – 4:54
 "To the New Light" (Avsenik/Chris Bohn/Laibach) – 5:00
 "Deus Ex Machina" (Avsenik/Laibach) – 4:00

References

Laibach (band) albums
1996 albums
Mute Records albums